Hyderabad is the capital of the Indian state of Telangana and de jure capital of Andhra Pradesh. It was established by Qutb Shahi sultan Muhammad Quli Qutb Shah in 1591 AD to expand their capital beyond the Golconda fort. The Charminar Masjid was constructed upon the inception of Hyderabad, the iconic mosques of Mecca Masjid and Hayat Bakshi Mosque were constructed during this dynasty and these style of architecture is known as Qutb Shahi Masajid—(Qutb Shahi Mosques). In 1769 AD when the city became capital of the Nizams of Hyderabad—(also known as Asaf Jahi dynasty), they had constructed many mosques in the process to expand the city, Afzal Gunj Masjid and Shahi Masjid are the resemblance of Asaf Jahi Masajid—(Asaf Jahi Mosques). Some of the iconic mosques in Hyderabad such as Toli Masjid, Mian Mishk Masjid, Spanish Mosque and Paigah Mosque were constructed by the prominent nobles of the former rulers of Hyderabad state.

References
The Spanish mosque: Moorish architecture in the heart of Hyderabad, The News Minute
Islamic Heritage of Hyderabad, The Telangana Tourism
Mecca Masjid, The times of India
Architectural marvels of spirituality, Telangana Today
Dictionary of Islamic Architecture, page-112, Andrew Petersen, 2002 Routledge
The heritage of the Qutb Shahis of Golconda and Hyderabad, M. A. Nayeem, 2006, The University of Michigan
The Qutb Shahi Monuments of Hyderabad Golconda Fort, Qutb Shahi Tombs, Charminar. 2010, UNESCO